Peak beard is a cultural phenomenon identified during the early 21st century, surmising that the perceived widespread prevalence of beards found in the general population of Western countries had reached a maximum.

University of New South Wales study 
The concept of peak beard gained wider prevalence following the publication of an academic paper from a team based at University of New South Wales, that suggested that there was a long term cyclic variance in the prevalence of beards in Western culture due to the role that scarcity of physical attributes plays in sexual selection in heterosexual men and bisexual and heterosexual women. They suggested that as facial hair becomes dominant,  clean-shaven faces become a more desirable trait in partner selection due to their scarcity. Similarly, when clean-shaven faces are dominant, beards become a more desired trait. This applied to both men and women as the observers.

2010s peak beard
The increasing prevalence of beards in the first decade of the 2000s had followed a period which was perceived as having a general lack of facial hair throughout the 1990s. It was suggested the growth of beards may have been triggered by the financial crisis in 2008, and that a similar pattern may have occurred following the Wall Street Crash in the 1920s. The beard during this period had become associated with emergence of the contemporary hipster subculture, which itself had been suggested to be a reaction to growth of the metrosexual male. The team hypothesised that beards follow a 30-year cycle. Whilst numerous media noted the possibility that beard prevalence had peaked in the early 2010s, a YouGov poll suggested that beards had become more commonplace in November 2016 compared with August 2011. This was reflected in the persistent decline in the sales of razor blades between 2013 and 2015. The beard's oft-predicted demise was suggested to have been further delayed by the onset of the COVID-19 pandemic, as remote working from home became rapidly widespread as a public health measure to mitigate the pandemic's spread.  That in turn made it acceptable for more workers to go through the unshaven look on their way to growing full beards.

References 

Beard
2010s fads and trends
2020s fashion
2010s fashion
2020s fads and trends
Human appearance
Male beauty
2010s neologisms
Hipster (contemporary subculture)
21st-century fashion